The COPSS Distinguished Achievement Award and Lectureship (formerly known as R. A. Fisher Award and Lectureship) is a very high recognition of achievement and scholarship in statistical science that recognizes the highly significant impact of statistical methods on scientific investigations. The award was established in 1963 by the North American Committee of Presidents of Statistical Societies (COPSS) "to honor both the contributions of Sir Ronald Aylmer Fisher and the work of a present–day statistician for their advancement of statistical theory and applications." The COPSS Distinguished Lecture is given at the Joint Statistical Meetings in North America and is subsequently published in a statistics journal. The lecturer receives a plaque and a cash award of US$1000. It is given every year if a nominee considered eligible and worthy is found, which one was in all but five years up to 1984, and in all years since. In June 2020, the name of the award was changed to its current name after discussions concerning Fisher's controversial views on race and eugenics.

Past recipients of the award
1964 Maurice Bartlett
1965 Oscar Kempthorne
1967 John Tukey
1968 Leo Goodman
1970 Leonard Savage
1971 Cuthbert Daniel
1972 William G. Cochran
1973 Jerome Cornfield
1974 George E. P. Box
1975 Herman Chernoff
1976 George Alfred Barnard
1977 R. C. Bose
1978 William Kruskal
1979 C. R. Rao
1982 F. J. Anscombe
1983 I. R. Savage
1985 Theodore W. Anderson
1986 David H. Blackwell
1987 Frederick Mosteller
1988 Erich Leo Lehmann
1989 David R. Cox
1990 Donald A. S. Fraser
1991 David Brillinger
1992 Paul Meier
1993 Herbert Robbins
1994 Elizabeth A. Thompson
1995 Norman Breslow
1996 Bradley Efron
1997 Colin Mallows
1998 Arthur P. Dempster
1999 Jack Kalbfleisch
2000 Ingram Olkin
2001 James O. Berger
2002 Raymond Carroll
2003 Adrian F. M. Smith
2004 Donald Rubin
2005 R. Dennis Cook
2006 Terence Speed
2007 Marvin Zelen
2008 Ross L. Prentice
2009 Noel Cressie
2010 Bruce G. Lindsay
2011 C.F. Jeff Wu
2012 Roderick Little
2013 Peter J. Bickel
2014 Grace Wahba
2015 Stephen Fienberg
2016 Alice S. Whittemore
2017 Robert E. Kass
2018 Susan Murphy
2019 Paul R. Rosenbaum
2020 Kathryn Roeder
2021 Wing Hung Wong

Renaming of the lectureship
On June 4, 2020, following national movements to fight systemic racism and police brutality in response to the murder of George Floyd, one of the Lectureship award committee members, Daniela Witten (UW), started a discussion on renaming the Fisher Lectureship on Twitter as R.A. Fisher was a eugenicist. A petition to "Rename The Fisher Lecture After David Blackwell" was initiated by Miles Ott (Smith) on Change.org. The COPSS leadership responded by soliciting input via an online form on the official website.

Harry Crane (Rutgers), Joseph Guinness (Cornell) and Ryan Martin (NCSU) posted a comment arguing against the renaming on June 13, 2020. They argued that the lectureship was established to honor Fisher's scientific achievement, not the scientist. They proposed to amend the description of the lectureship instead of renaming it.

On June 15 the Executive Director of ASA, Ron Wasserstein, notified its members that the leadership has recommended changing the lectureship name to COPSS. The process that led to the decision was unclear. Ron commented on Twitter, "There is no principle of greater value than the principle of strengthening the statistical community by moving forward to form a more just, equitable, diverse, and inclusive society". 

On June 23, the name R.A. Fisher Award and Lectureship was officially retired and the announced recipient of the award for 2020, Kathryn Roeder, was to receive the award under the new name. The chair of COPSS, Bhramar Mukherjee, also made the announcement on Twitter. In their statement, the COPSS mentioned that they retired the previous name of the award "to advance a more just, equitable, diverse, and inclusive statistical community."

Other lecture series named after R. A. Fisher
Two other series of lectures are also named after R. A. Fisher:
The Fisher Memorial Lecture on an application of mathematics to biology,  usually given in the UK, first given in 1964
 The Sir Ronald Fisher Lecture on genetics, evolutionary biology or statistics, given at the University of Adelaide, Australia, first given in 1990

See also
 COPSS Presidents' Award
 International Prize in Statistics
 Guy Medals
 List of mathematics awards

References

External links 
 Official website

Statistical awards
American awards
Awards established in 1963